The 2010 Letran Knights men's basketball team represented Colegio de San Juan de Letran in the 86th season of the National Collegiate Athletic Association in the Philippines. The men's basketball tournament for the school year 2010-11 began on June 26, 2010, and the host school for the season was San Sebastian College–Recoletos.

The Knights finished the double round-robin eliminations at fifth place with 7 wins against 9 losses. This is the first time the Knights missed the Final Four playoffs since 2002.

Roster 

 Depth chart Depth chart

NCAA Season 86 games results 

Elimination games were played in a double round-robin format. All games were aired on Studio 23.

Source: inboundPASS

References 

Letran Knights basketball team seasons